The 1962 Fresno State Bulldogs football team represented Fresno State College—now known as California State University, Fresno—as a member of the California Collegiate Athletic Association (CCAA) during the 1962 NCAA College Division football season. Led by fourth-year head coach Cecil Coleman, Fresno State compiled an overall record of 7–3 with a mark of 4–1 in conference play, placing second in the CCAA. The Bulldogs played home games at Ratcliffe Stadium on the campus of Fresno City College in Fresno, California.

Fresno State started the year ranked No. 1 in the AP Small-College Football Poll. They never dropped out of the top 10 all season, finishing No. 7 in the final UPI poll and No. 8 in the final AP poll.

Schedule

Team players in the NFL/AFL
The following were selected in the 1963 NFL Draft.

The following were selected in the 1963 AFL Draft.

References

Fresno State
Fresno State Bulldogs football seasons
Fresno State Bulldogs football